Admiral Sir George Back  (6 November 1796 – 23 June 1878) was a British Royal Navy officer, explorer of the Canadian Arctic, naturalist and artist. He was born in Stockport.

Career
As a boy, he went to sea as a volunteer in the frigate  in 1808 and took part in the destruction of batteries on the Spanish coast. In the following year, he was involved in combat in the Bay of Biscay, until he was captured by the French. Back remained a prisoner at Verdun until the peace of early 1814; during this time he studied French and mathematics and practised his skills as an artist, which he later put to use in recording his travels through the Canadian Arctic.

Back also served under Franklin in his two overland expeditions to survey the northern coast of North America, first on the Coppermine expedition—when Back was responsible for all the surveying and chart making—and then the Mackenzie River expedition in 1824–1826, during which time he was promoted first to lieutenant and then to commander in 1825. Lacking appointment to a ship, Back was unemployed on the half-pay list, from 1827 to 1833.

Back River Expedition
By 1832 nothing had been heard of the Arctic explorer John Ross since 1829, and plans were made to find him. Back proposed to take fur trade routes to the Great Slave Lake and follow the Great Fish River northeast to Ross's probable location. No white man had ever seen this river but it was known from Indian reports (it was later named the Back River).

He left England in February 1833, reached the Great Slave Lake in August where George McLeod of the Hudson's Bay Company had built winter quarters at Fort Reliance at the eastern end of the lake. He located the river on 29 August and returned to the fort to winter. In March 1834 he received a packet of letters saying that Ross was back in England and telling him to explore the coast from Ross's King William Land to Franklin's Point Turnagain. This was the main unknown region, along with a few hundred miles eastward from Point Barrow and the area around King William Island which was completely misunderstood.

He set out on 7 June 1834, passed Artillery Lake and Clinton-Colden Lake and reached the river on 28 June. He ran east down a river in the barren grounds with 83 rapids but only one portage. On 23 July he reached salt water at Chantrey Inlet. He explored the inlet, saw King William Island to the north and then unheroically but wisely turned back. He reached Fort Reliance on 27 September 1834 and England on 8 September 1835.

The expedition's naturalist was Richard King, who contributed appendices on meteorology and botany to Back's account of the expedition; he also wrote his own two-volume account of the expedition.

Frozen Strait Expedition

In 1836, Back was promoted to captain by an Order in Council, a rare honour. The goal this time was the northern end of Hudson Bay at either Repulse Bay (now Naujaat) or Wager Inlet. From there he would drag boats overland to seawater and sail the unknown coast west to the Back River and Franklin's Point Turnagain. These were the two easternmost known points on the north coast west of Hudson Bay. The area between them and between the Back River and Hudson Bay was unknown. He was given command of the converted bomb vessel  with a crew of 60 and provisions for 18 months.

He left in June 1836, which was late in the season. Because of contrary winds they had to be towed by steamship all the way to the Orkney Islands. He reached Hudson Strait on the first of August. By the end of the month, Terror was beset by ice somewhere east of Frozen Strait. It remained icebound for 10 months: at one point Terror was pushed  up the side of a cliff by the pressure of the ice.

Several times preparations were made to abandon ship. Scurvy appeared in January and three men died of it. In the spring of 1837, an encounter with an iceberg further damaged the ship. Sometimes the pressure of the ice was enough to force turpentine out of the planks. The ship drifted with the ice south along Southampton Island and then east toward Hudson Strait. It was not until July that the ice retreated sufficiently to allow Terror to head for home.

Soon a large mass of ice frozen to the vessel broke off causing the remaining ice to tip the ship on its side until the ice was hacked off. The vessel was in a sinking condition by the time he was able to beach the ship on the coast of Ireland at Lough Swilly. "There was not one on board who did not express astonishment that we had ever floated across the Atlantic."

Although a number of Arctic explorers allowed their ships to be frozen in harbours for the winter, this seems to be the only case of a ship – save for the disastrous Franklin Expedition – being caught in offshore ice. Its survival is a tribute to the strength of bomb vessels in Arctic service.

Retirement
Poor health caused Back to retire from active service. He was made a Knight Bachelor on 18 March 1839, and maintained an interest in Arctic exploration for the rest of his life. In 1859, he was nominated a rear-admiral. Back served as an advisor to the Admiralty during the search for Franklin's lost expedition, and as vice-president of the Royal Geographical Society, having received its gold and silver medal. Although nominally retired, Back remained on the Admiralty List and, based on seniority, he was promoted to vice-admiral in 1863 and finally admiral in 1867.

Personal life 
In 1846, Back married Theodosia Elizabeth Hammond, a widow. He is buried in the Kensal Green Cemetery, London.

Back as artist
George Back was an accomplished artist. Historian Leslie H. Neatby wrote, “Back had neither the seriousness of disposition nor the intensity of purpose which are indispensable to the great captain. His virtues were of a different order. No other man has viewed the scenery of the Canadian North with so appreciative an eye, nor has been able to give such full and vigorous expression to that appreciation.”

A watercolour of an iceberg, believed to have been painted by Back following his 1836–37 expedition, sold at auction on 13 September 2011 for $59,600, despite its being unsigned and undated. Experts at the prestigious London auction house Bonhams credited the watercolour to Back, claiming it had been presented by Back to his sister Katherine Pares, and thence descended through her family.

The auction house opined that the scene surrounding the towering iceberg appears to match a description in Back's Narrative of an Expedition in H.M.S. Terror (1838) when the Terror was in the Davis Strait (between Canada and Greenland) that reads "in the evening (of 29 July 1836) when the weather cleared ... we observed an enormous berg, the perpendicular face of which was not less than 300 feet high..."

Back drew HMS Terror Thrown Up By Ice (1836) and the portrait A Buffalo Pound (1823), which was later reworked into an engraving. He painted the watercolour 'Winter View of Fort Franklin' (1825–26).

A recent collection of twelve portrait studies of male and female characters mainly from the Canadian Yellow Knife Tribe, eleven of which were personally signed by the artist sold for £24,000 at auction on 16 June 2020.

Bibliography

Further reading
Recent
 
 

Historical
 
 ; Original scanned copies at Canadiana.org; at Archive.org; .
 ; Original scanned copies .

External links 

 
 
 
 

19th-century Canadian painters
Canadian male painters
19th-century explorers
1796 births
1878 deaths
British polar explorers
British prisoners of war (Napoleonic Wars)
English entomologists
English explorers of North America
Explorers of Canada
Explorers of the Arctic
Fellows of the Royal Society
Knights Bachelor
Napoleonic Wars prisoners of war held by France
People educated at Stockport Grammar School
People from Stockport
Persons of National Historic Significance (Canada)
Royal Navy admirals
Royal Navy personnel of the Napoleonic Wars
Recipients of the Royal Geographical Society Founder's Medal